This is a chronological listing of Patricia Morison's major acting credits.  It includes her stage, screen, and television work, as well as one of her radio credits.

Credits

1933–1940

1941–1950

1951–1960

1961–2003

Other credits
Throughout the 1960s and 1970s, Morison performed on stage numerous times — largely in stock and touring productions.  These included both musical and dramatic plays, among them Milk and Honey, Kismet, The Merry Widow, Song of Norway, Do I Hear a Waltz?, Bell, Book and Candle,   The Fourposter, Separate Tables, and Private Lives.

Footnotes

Sources
 
 
 Dossier of Patricia Morison prepared by theatre and film historian Miles Krueger at the Institute of the American Musical, Inc., Los Angeles, California, April 29, 1999.

Actress filmographies
American filmographies